Chamaepinnularia is a genus of diatoms belonging to the family Naviculaceae.

Species:

Chamaepinnularia abdita 
Chamaepinnularia aerophila 
Chamaepinnularia alexandrowiczii

References

Naviculales
Diatom genera